is a Japanese manga artist. Her manga Kimi ni Todoke won the award for best shōjo at the 32nd Kodansha Manga Award, and it was nominated for the first Manga Taishō in 2008. It was also adapted into an anime television series and a live action film.

Works

One volume stories
Analog Apaato - 1996
Orange Apartment - 1997 (sequel of Analog Apaato)
Stand by Me - 1998
Garakuta Planet - 1999
Ibitsu na Hoshi no Katachi - 1999
Hi ga Kuretemo Aruiteru - 2001Sakura Ryou March - 2001Koi ni Ochiru - 2002Ashita wa Docchi da - 2002Aoi Futari - 2003Mayuge no Kakudo wa 45° de - 2013 (single chapter, crossover of Kimi ni Todoke and Kazune Kawahara's Aozora Yell)

Multi-volume storiesCrazy for You - 6 volumes, 2003-2005Kimi ni Todoke - 30 volumes, 2006-2017Kimi ni Todoke Bangaihen: Unmei no Hito - 3 volumes, 2018-2022

OtherKimi ni Todoke - 16 volumes, novel, author: Kanae Shimokawa, 2007-2015 todayKimi ni Todoke: Ashita ni Nareba - one volume, novel, author: Kanae Shimokawa, 2009Kimi ni Todoke'' - 13 volumes, Juvenille Books, author: Kanako Shirai 2011-2015

References

External links

 List of Works at Shueisha

Living people
Women manga artists
Manga artists from Hokkaido
Japanese female comics artists
Female comics writers
Japanese women writers
1975 births